Critoniadelphus is a genus of flowering plants in the family Asteraceae.

 Species
 Critoniadelphus microdon (B.L.Rob.) R.M.King & H.Rob. - Guatemala, Mexico (Chiapas)
 Critoniadelphus nubigenus (Benth.) R.M.King & H.Rob. - Guatemala, Honduras, El Salvador, Mexico  (Chiapas)

References

Asteraceae genera
Eupatorieae
Flora of North America